Crinodendron is a genus of flowering plants belonging to the family Elaeocarpaceae. The eight species are evergreen shrubs or small trees native to the forests of Chile. They have narrow, leathery evergreen leaves and pendent bell-shaped flowers in red, pink or white.

In cultivation in temperate areas they require a sheltered location.

References

External links
 
 

Elaeocarpaceae
Elaeocarpaceae genera